The Greystone Mill Historic District encompasses an early 20th-century textile mill complex on Greystone Avenue in Johnston and North Providence, Rhode Island.  The complex consists of three brick buildings on the North Providence side of the Woonasquatucket River, a dam spanning the river, and a water tank near the dam in Johnston.  The main structure consists of a series of structures combined to form a rambling structure, built between 1904 and 1911 to designs by Frank Sheldon and Son, an architectural firm that was a leading designer of textile facilities at the time.

The mill complex was listed on the National Register of Historic Places in 2004.  Its elements also contribute to the Greystone Historic District, listed in 2008.

See also
National Register of Historic Places listings in Providence County, Rhode Island

References

Industrial archaeological sites in the United States
Historic districts in Providence County, Rhode Island
Industrial buildings and structures in Rhode Island
Buildings and structures in North Providence, Rhode Island
Buildings and structures in Johnston, Rhode Island
National Register of Historic Places in Providence County, Rhode Island
Historic districts on the National Register of Historic Places in Rhode Island